Biphyllidae, or false skin beetles, are a family of beetles, in the superfamily Cleroidea. The have a cosmopolitan distribution (excluding New Zealand). About 195 species are known. They live under the bark of dead trees and in leaf litter, and are mycophagous, feeding on fungi.

Taxonomy 
The family contains the following genera:
 Althaesia Pascoe, 1860
 Anchorius Casey, 1900
 Anobocaelus Sharp, 1902
 Biphyllus Dejean, 1821 
 Diplocoelus Guérin-Méneville, 1836
 Euderopus Sharp, 1900
 Gonicoelus Sharp, 1900
 †Paleobiphyllus Makarov and Perkovsky 2019 Taimyr amber, Russia, Late Cretaceous (Santonian)

References

 
Cleroidea
Polyphaga families